Le Baiser de la fée (The Fairy's Kiss) is a neoclassical ballet in one act and four scenes composed by Igor Stravinsky in 1928 and revised in 1950 for George Balanchine and the New York City Ballet. Based on Hans Christian Andersen's short story Isjomfruen (English: The Ice-Maiden), the work is an homage to Pyotr Ilyich Tchaikovsky, for the 35th anniversary of the composer's death. Stravinsky elaborated several melodies from early piano pieces and songs by Tchaikovsky in his score. A commission by Ida Rubinstein from 1927, the ballet was choreographed by Bronislava Nijinska and premiered in Paris on 27 November 1928.

In his conversations with Robert Craft, Stravinsky did not specify which Tchaikovsky pieces he drew upon, but "Danses suisses" quotes one of the more easily identifiable Tchaikovsky themes, the "Humoresque" from Two Pieces, Opus 10 (1871). However, musicologist David Drew provided several musical sources in his liner notes for the 1963 Decca recording of the ballet by Ernest Ansermet:
 Scene I: Andante. Figures from Op. 19 No. 4 and the Barcarolle 'Juin' from Op. 37 bis
 Vivace agitato. Figure from Op. 54 No. 7
 Scene II: Tempo giusto. Humoresque Op. 10 No. 2 and Reverie du Soir, Op. 19 No. 1
 Valse. Natha-Valse, Op. 51 No. 4
 Scene III: Allegretto grazioso. Scherzo humoresque Op. 19 No. 2
 Doppio movimento. Feuillet d'Album Op. 19 No. 3
 Pas de deux. Nocturne, Op. 19 No. 4, Più mosso section
 Scene—Andante non tanto. None but the lonely heart, Op. 6 No. 6
"In addition to the above, Robert Craft—joint author with Stravinsky of Expositions and Developments, the composer's third volume of autobiographical musings—supplies the following titles:"
 Scherzo à la Russe, Op. 1 No. 1 for piano
 Painfully and Sweetly, Op. 6 No. 3 for voice and piano
 The Mujik plays the harmonica, Op. 39 No. 12 for piano
 In the Village, Op. 40 No. 7 for piano
 Danse russe, Op. 40 No. 10 for piano
 Salon valse, Op. 31 No. 1 for piano
 Lullaby on a storm (Berceuse), Op. 54 No. 10 for voice and piano
 Serenade, Op. 63 No. 6 for voice and piano

In 1937, Balanchine made a full-length ballet for his American Ballet, which premiered on 27 April, at the Old Metropolitan Opera House, New York City. His 1950 version premiered on 28 November, at City Center of Music and Drama, New York, at which time it was presented under the English translation of the title, The Fairy's Kiss (the original French title is now more commonly used by English-speakers).

In 1960 Kenneth MacMillan choreographed his own version for The Royal Ballet.

Divertimento from Le Baiser de la fée 

The Divertimento from Le Baiser de la fée is a concert suite for orchestra based on music from the ballet. Stravinsky arranged it in collaboration with Samuel Dushkin in 1934 and revised it in 1949. It has four movements:

In 1932 Samuel Dushkin and the composer produced a version for violin and piano, using
the same title. Another episode from the ballet was arranged for violin and piano by Dushkin with the title Ballad. However, the latter only received the composer’s assent in 1947 after the French violinist Jeanne Gautier put forward an arrangement.

Balanchine created an entirely new work for the City Ballet's Stravinsky Festival, using excerpts from the concert suite and the original ballet. The premiere took place on 21 June 1972, at the New York State Theater, Lincoln Center. In 1974, Balanchine incorporated Tchaikovsky's "None but the Lonely Heart" for a new pas de deux.

Original casts

American Ballet 
Kathryn Mullowny
Gisella Caccialanza
Leda Anchutina
Annabelle Lyon
William Dollar

New York City Ballet: Divertimento from Le Baiser de la fée 
Patricia McBride
Bettijane Sills
Carol Sumner
Helgi Tomasson

References

Sources

 Playbill, New York City Ballet, Friday, June 20, 2008
 Repertory Week, New York City Ballet, Spring Season, 2008 repertory, week 8

Reviews 

  
NY Times by Alastair Macaulay, February 9, 2008
NY Times by Jennifer Dunning, May 30, 2006
NY Times by Gia Kourlas, May 30, 2005
NY Times by Anna Kisselgoff, November 23, 1987
NY Times by Anna Kisselgoff, June 13, 1981
NY Times by Anna Kisselgoff, November 20, 1979
NY Times by Anna Kisselgoff, February 4, 1974
NY Times by Clive Barnes, June 22, 1972
NY Times by John Martin, November 26, 1951
Sunday New York Times by John Martin, May 30, 1937
Sunday NY Times by John Martin, May 2, 1937
NY Times by John Martin, April 28, 1937

External links 

Ballets by Igor Stravinsky
1928 compositions
Ballets by Bronislava Nijinska
1928 ballet premieres
1950 compositions
Neoclassicism (music)
Ballets by George Balanchine
New York City Ballet repertory
New York City Ballet Stravinsky Festival